City Brewing Company is a large brewery located in La Crosse, Wisconsin, USA. It also goes by the trade name of City Brewery.

History 

In 1999 the old G. Heileman Brewing Company's former brewery buildings in La Crosse were bought by a group of investors who founded the City Brewing Company.
This brought the brewing facility back in name only to 1858 when German immigrants John Gund and Gottlieb Heileman originally founded the City Brewery in La Crosse.

In September 2006, the company agreed to purchase the Latrobe Brewery in Latrobe, Pennsylvania. The new City Brewery Latrobe entered into an agreement with Boston Beer Company in April 2007, and began producing that company's Samuel Adams beer that spring. In March 2011, the company bought a brewery in Memphis, Tennessee, originally built by Schlitz in 1971, for $30 million. It is commonly known as the Blues City Brewery.

National distribution is occurring in support of new brands DB Hobbs Lager and DB Hobbs Light, at 4.81% abv and 4.15% abv respectively, which some publications indicate may be relabeled versions of the LaCrosse Lager line.

Purchase of Latrobe Brewery

As Anheuser-Busch moved production of Rolling Rock to New Jersey in 2006, an owner was sought for the original Latrobe Brewing Company in Pennsylvania. City Brewery completed the purchase and in March 2007, the Latrobe brewery reopened its doors and produced Samuel Adams. The Boston Beer Company signed a deal with the plant's current owners in April 2007, to produce beer in the plant. The Boston Beer Company had pledged 3 to 7 million dollars to upgrade the plant. It is estimated that 200,000 to 250,000 barrels of beer would be produced in the plant during the remainder of 2007.

In late October 2008, City Brewery-Latrobe laid off 70 workers forcing a temporary shutdown, and stopped brewing beer at the plant in November.  Boston Beer Co. moved their operations to an old Schaefer brewery they purchased near Allentown, Pennsylvania. In May 2009, Iron City Brewing signed a deal with City Brewing Co to begin producing beer at the plant, with brewing started in June and bottling/kegging production resumed in July, 2009.

In July 2009 some Southampton brands (Double White, IPA, Altbier, Pumpkin, Imperial Porter) were moved to Latrobe from Lion Brewing, of Wilkes-Barre, PA.

In addition to Iron City Beer, City Brewing also produces Stoney's and Stoney's Light in Latrobe.

In 2009, the Latrobe plant installed a can line and started canning in 12- and 16-ounce packages. A 24-ounce can line was added later.

Other uses of "City Brewery"

City Brewery was also the name of another Wisconsin company founded by Johann Braun in 1846, which merged into the Valentin Blatz Brewing Company of Milwaukee.

City Brewery was also the name of a brewing company founded in 1855 in Dunkirk by George Dotterweich, an immigrant from Germany. George Dotterweich died in 1884 and the brewery was taken over by his brother, Andrew J. Dotterweich.  In 1900, Andrew J. died and the brewery was taken over by his son Andrew C. Dotterweich. The company name was then changed to the A. Dotterweich Brewing Company, and operations continued until the start of Prohibition.

Other brands brewed

A number of other breweries and beverage companies contract or have contracted out to City Brewing Company. Among the other brands:
Arizona Tea
Monster Energy
Zima
Schneider's Tea
Shaq Soda
Angry Orchard
Iron City
IC Light
Atwater IPA
Founding Fathers Lager & Light
Milwaukee Lager & Light
Narragansett
Mike's Hard Lemonade
Lucky Number 7 Malt Liquor
Potosi Light
Kronik Energy Drink
Smirnoff Ice
Samuel Adams
Drink Four Brewing Company
Blue Point Brewing
Duquesne Pilsner
Milwaukee Premium Classic Lager and Light
Kül Lite
Red Stripe
Crazy Stallion
The Bronx Brewery
Sapporo
William K Busch Brewing Co
Montucky Cold Snacks
Sixpoint
Guinness Blonde American Lager
Camo Brewing Company

References

Bibliography
 Brewed with Style:The Story of the House of Heileman, Paul Koeller and David H. Delano, 2004, published by the University of Wisconsin–La Crosse Foundation and the City Brewing Company.

External links
CityBrewery.com, official website
Article on the brewery in Wisconsin Business Journal

La Crosse, Wisconsin
Beer brewing companies based in Wisconsin